Tyler Scott, (born September 21, 1985 in Windsor, Ontario) is a wide receiver in the Canadian Football League who last played for the Edmonton Eskimos. He attended the University of Western Ontario as a geography major and intends to pursue teaching. He was drafted in the 2008 CFL Draft by the Toronto Argonauts.

Professional career 
Scott's first game in the CFL was the pre-season game against the Montreal Alouettes on June 12, 2008, where he had two receptions for 20 yards for the Argonauts. Assistant General Manager Greg Mohns was impressed with his dedication, size, and movement. "He studied the playbook and he has not made a lot of mental mistakes," Mohns said following the first game. "He has a chance to make the final roster."

On May 27, 2010, Scott was released by the Toronto Argonauts.  Scott was recently picked up by the Edmonton Eskimos on July 27, 2010, signing a two-year deal.

On June 8, 2012, during training camp, Scott collided with defensive back Rico Murray and was hospitalized.  Scott has been placed on the 9-game injured list.

References

External links 
 Edmonton Eskimos profile

1985 births
Living people
Canadian football wide receivers
Edmonton Elks players
Players of Canadian football from Ontario
Saginaw Valley State Cardinals football players
Sportspeople from Windsor, Ontario
Toronto Argonauts players
Western Mustangs football players